Nahr-e Vasleh (also Romanized as Nahr-e Vaṣleh) is a village in Abshar Rural District, in the Central District of Shadegan County, Khuzestan Province, Iran. At the 2006 census, its population was 908, in 174 families.

References 

Populated places in Shadegan County